Lagman is a surname. Notable people with the surname include:

Edcel Lagman (born 1942), Filipino lawyer and politician
Fabian Lagman (born 1962), Argentine footballer
Filemon Lagman (1953–2001), Filipino communist and trade unionist

See also
Layman (surname)